Olivier is the French form of the given name Oliver. It may refer to:

 Olivier (given name), a list of people and fictional characters
 Olivier (surname), a list of people
 Château Olivier, a Bordeaux winery
Olivier, Louisiana, a rural populated place in the United States
 Olivier (crater), on the Moon
 Olivier salad, a popular dish of Russian cuisine
 Olivier (novel), the first published novel by French author Claire de Duras
 The Olivier Theatre (named after the actor Laurence Olivier), one of three auditoria at the Royal National Theatre
 The Laurence Olivier Awards, a theatrical award
 Olivier (comics), a foe of The Punisher

See also
 Olivier, Olivier, a 1992 drama film